Johannes Jakobus Kitshoff (born 25 January 1984 in George, South Africa) is a former South African rugby union player, that played first class rugby with the  between 2012 and 2016. He was a utility forward that could play as a lock, flanker or number eight.

He announced his retirement at the end of the 2016 season.

Career

Youth and amateur rugby

At school level, he played for Worcester Gymnasium and he represented Boland at various underage levels, including playing in the 2004 Under-20 Provincial Championship. He was also part of the  side that played in the Under-21 Provincial Championship in 2005.

He then spent years playing club rugby for Rawsonville in the Boland club leagues. He joined Durbanville-Bellville in the Western Province Super League for 2011 before returning to Boland to play for Ceres.

Boland Cavaliers

In 2013, he made eight appearances in the Vodacom Cup and Currie Cup competitions and he played in all seven of their matches in the 2014 Vodacom Cup competition. He also started five of their six matches in the 2014 Currie Cup qualification tournament, where they finished fifth to progress to the 2014 Currie Cup First Division.

References

South African rugby union players
Living people
1984 births
George
Rugby union locks
Rugby union flankers
Rugby union number eights
Boland Cavaliers players
Rugby union players from the Western Cape